A triangle is a geometric shape with three sides.
Triangle may also refer to:

Mathematics
 Exact triangle, a collection of objects in category theory
 Triangle inequality, Euclid's proposition that the sum of any two sides of a triangle is longer than the third side
 American expression for set square, an object used in engineering and technical drawing, with the aim of providing a straightedge at a right angle or other particular planar angle to a baseline

Entertainment

Music
 Triangle (musical instrument), in the percussion family
 Tri Angle (record label), in New York and London
 Triangle (band) a Japanese pop group in 1970s
 The Triangles, Australian band

Albums
 Tri-Angle, a 2004 album by TVXQ
 Triangle (The Beau Brummels album), 1967
 Triangle (Perfume album), 2009
 Triangle (Diaura album), 2014
 Triangle, a 2008 album by Mi Lu Bing
 Triangle, a 2011 EP by 10,000 Maniacs

Film
 Triangle Film Corporation, a film studio in the U.S. during the silent era
 The Triangle (film), a 2001 made-for-TV thriller
 Triangle (2007 film), a Hong Kong crime-thriller
 Triangle (2009 British film), a British-Australian psychological thriller
 Triangle (2009 South Korean film), a South Korean-Japanese comedy
 The Triangle, a 1953 film starring Douglas Fairbanks Jr.

Television
 The Triangle (miniseries), a 2005 Sci-Fi Channel series
 Triangle (1981 TV series), a 1980s BBC soap opera
 Triangle (2014 TV series), a 2014 MBC Korean drama
 "Triangle" (Buffy the Vampire Slayer), 2001
 "Triangle" (The X-Files), 1998
 "Triangles", an episode of Private Practice

Places
 Le Triangle, a residential district in Montreal
 Triangle, Newfoundland and Labrador, Canada
 Triangle (Israel), a concentration of Israeli Arab towns
 Triangle Region (Denmark) (Trekanten), a sub-region on the Jutland Peninsula
 Trianglen, Copenhagen, a large intersection in Copenhagen, Denmark
 Research Triangle, a region of North Carolina, U.S., anchored by Raleigh, Durham, and Chapel Hill
 Triangle, New York, United States
 Triangle, Virginia, United States
 Triangle, West Yorkshire, a village in Calderdale, England
 Triangle, Zimbabwe

Other uses
 Triangle (chart pattern), in financial technical analysis
 Triangle (novel), a 1983 Star Trek novel
 Triangle (Paris building)
 Triangle (railway), an English term equivalent to a North American Wye rail
 Triangle Fraternity, social fraternity
 Triangle offense, an offensive strategy used in basketball
 Triangle Rewards, a loyalty program offered by Canadian Tire
 The Triangle (newspaper), at Drexel University
 The Triangle, Manchester, a building in England
 Triangles (novel), a 2011 novel by Ellen Hopkins
 Delta (letter), in the Greek alphabet, whose uppercase resembles a triangle (Δ)
 Trigonodes hyppasia or Triangles, a species of moth

See also
Triangle Lake (disambiguation)
Triangle Park (disambiguation)

Triangeln station, a railway station in Malmö, Sweden
Triangular trade
Triangulum (disambiguation)